The 2018 Rally Italia Sardegna (formally known as the Rally Italia Sardegna 2018) was a motor racing event for rally cars that was held over four days between 7 and 10 June 2018. It marked the fifteenth running of Rally Italia Sardegna, and was the seventh round of the 2018 FIA World Rally Championship and its support categories, the WRC-2 and WRC-3 championships. The event was based in Alghero in Sardinia and consisted of twenty special stages totalling  in competitive kilometres.

Ott Tänak and Martin Järveoja were the defending rally winners. Thierry Neuville and Nicolas Gilsoul were the rally winners. Their team, Hyundai Shell Mobis WRT, were the manufacturers' winners. The Škoda Motorsport II crew of Jan Kopecký and Pavel Dresler won the World Rally Championship-2 category in a Škoda Fabia R5, while the crew of Jean-Baptiste Franceschi and Romain Courbon won the World Rally Championship-3.

Background

Championship standings prior to the event
Thierry Neuville and Nicolas Gilsoul entered the round with a nineteen-point lead in the World Championship for Drivers and Co-drivers. In the World Championship for Manufacturers, Hyundai Shell Mobis WRT held a thirteen-point lead over M-Sport Ford WRT.

Entry list
The following crews were entered into the rally. The event was open to crews competing in the World Rally Championship, World Rally Championship-2, and the World Rally Championship-3. The final entry list consisted of fifteen World Rally Cars, twelve World Rally Championship-2 entries, and four World Rally Championship-3 entries.

Report

Pre-event

The Citroën pairing of Kris Meeke and Paul Nagle were entered into the rally, but were subsequently withdrawn when the team released Meeke from his contract. The team did not enter another crew in their place.

Thursday
Defending world champion Sébastien Ogier, driving a Fiesta, took a slender 0.1 second lead over Andreas Mikkelsen. Championship leader Thierry Neuville was another 0.6 second behind. Elfyn Evans was fourth, followed by Hayden Paddon and Esapekka Lappi. Teammate Teemu Suninen was seventh, while the shakedown winner Jari-Matti Latvala in eighth. Mads Østberg and Ott Tänak were in ninth and tenth respectively to complete the top ten.

Friday
Muddy roads, caused by unpredictable rainy weather, made the first day of Sardegna very tricky. In uncharacteristic conditions, defending world champion Sébastien Ogier took a dramatic lead over the championship leader Thierry Neuville by 18.9 seconds after Andreas Mikkelsen retired from the day due to gearbox issue. Because of teammate Teemu Suninen's off road and Ott Tänak's radiator damage caused by a heavy bump, Jari-Matti Latvala climbed up to the podium place, followed by his teammate Esapekka Lappi, another 4.4 seconds behind. Two Citroën drivers Mads Østberg and Craig Breen were in sixth and eighth respectively, sandwiched Hayden Paddon in a Hyundai i20. Elfyn Evans dropped out of top twenty after breaking a steering arm due to hitting a rock in his Ford Fiesta. WRC-2 category leader Stéphane Lefebvre, Jan Kopecký and Nicolas Ciamin completed the leaderboard.

Saturday
After a fifteen-stage fight, title rivals Sébastien Ogier and Thierry Neuville only separated by 3.9 seconds on the top. Jari-Matti Latvala, eighth overall, originally ended the day in third, but an alternator problem forced him to retired from the day, which made his teammate Esapekka Lappi snatch the podium place. Hayden Paddon and Mads Østberg presented us another great fight. Eventually, the Hyundai edged the Citroën by only 2.1 seconds. Craig Breen was in sixth, over a minute further behind, with WRC-2 category leader Jan Kopecký in seventh. Ott Tänak, who was running under Rally2 regulations, recovered to ninth after yesterday's engine damage, followed by Martin Prokop completed the top ten.

Sunday
The fastest times of the morning stages were all taken by the championship leader Thierry Neuville, which reduced the gap between the rally leader Sébastien Ogier to just 0.8 second. In the Power Stage, the Hyundai star took another stage win and overtook the defending world champion to snatch the victory from Ogier. The difference between two title rivals was only 0.7 second, the third tightest winning margin in WRC history, which shared with 2017 Rally Argentina. Esapekka Lappi ran out of the podium place in a Yaris, followed by Hayden Paddon in fourth overall. Two Citroën drivers Mads Østberg and Craig Breen were in fifth and sixth respectively, ahead of Jari-Matti Latvala, who was running under Rally2 regulations. WRC-2 category leader Jan Kopecký was in eighth after Ott Tänak received a forty-second penalty due to a four-minute late, while Teemu Suninen completed the top ten.

Classification

Top ten finishers
The following crews finished the rally in each class's top ten.

Other notable finishers
The following notable crews finished the rally outside top ten.

Special stages

Power stage
The Power stage was a 6.96 km stage at the end of the rally. Additional World Championship points were awarded to the five fastest crews.

Penalties
The following notable crews were given time penalty during the rally.

Retirements
The following notable crews retired from the event. Under Rally2 regulations, they were eligible to re-enter the event starting from the next leg. Crews that re-entered were given an additional time penalty.

Championship standings after the rally

Drivers' championships

Co-Drivers' championships

Manufacturers' and teams' championships

Notes

References

External links

  
 2018 Rally Italia Sardegna in e-wrc website
 The official website of the World Rally Championship

Italy
2018
2018 in Italian motorsport
June 2018 sports events in Italy